Catopsis nutans is a species in the genus Catopsis. This species is native to Florida, Central America, Greater Antilles (Cuba, Hispaniola, Jamaica), Venezuela, Colombia, Bolivia, and Ecuador.

References

nutans
Flora of Central America
Flora of Mexico
Flora of the Caribbean
Flora of Florida
Flora of South America
Plants described in 1788
Flora without expected TNC conservation status